The Thomas Chivers House, on Challis Creek Rd. in Challis, Idaho, was built in 1910.  It was listed on the National Register of Historic Places in 1980.

It was assessed to be "the most elaborate, least altered, and best preserved two-story Queen Anne-style house in Challis."

It is relatively large for Challis, and is a plain implementation of Queen Anne style with Colonial Revival influences.  It is a frame house built of roughly finished lumber, upon a mortared rock foundation.  It has window head moldings, eave returns, and enclosed eaves, as well as the only known stained glass in Challis.

See also
Thomas Chivers Cellar

References

		
National Register of Historic Places in Custer County, Idaho
Queen Anne architecture in Idaho
Houses completed in 1910